Muhammad Kannayan (born 1932, died before 2016) was an Indian footballer. He competed in the men's tournament at the 1956 Summer Olympics.

References

External links
 
 

1932 births
Year of death missing
Footballers from Bangalore
Indian footballers
India international footballers
Olympic footballers of India
Footballers at the 1956 Summer Olympics
Place of birth missing
Association football forwards
Calcutta Football League players